China-Serbian relations are foreign relations between the People's Republic of China and the Republic of Serbia. Relations have been maintained since SFR Yugoslavia's recognition of PR China on October 1, 1949, while diplomatic relations between the two countries were formally established by the exchange of diplomatic notes between the two Foreign Ministers on January 2, 1955. China has an embassy in Belgrade and also maintains an office in Priština based on consent of the Government of Serbia from November 2006. Serbia has an embassy in Beijing and a consulate-general in Shanghai. In 2017, Serbia and China mutually abolished the requirement of obtaining an entry visa for its citizens.

History

1990 to present 
The PRC supported the Federal Republic of Yugoslavia during the Kosovo War and opposed the NATO airstrikes against targets in Serbia and Montenegro. The PRC believed that Milošević was acting to prevent the secession of Kosovo by Albanian separatists from the FRY, and thus supported his actions as preserving the FRY's territorial integrity. The PRC opposed NATO intervention in Kosovo on the basis that it set a dangerous precedent that PRC officials believed could in the future afflict the PRC, should riots occur in Tibet or Xinjiang and then result in bombings. PRC opposition to the NATO actions intensified after the bombing of the PR Chinese embassy in Belgrade during the war.

Under president Aleksandar Vučić, Serbia has sought closer cooperation with China. After meeting with Chinese Minister of Foreign Affairs Wang Yi, he secured Chinese help in combating the COVID-19 pandemic in Serbia through delivery of PPE and CoronaVac vaccine doses, which has contributed to Serbia  leading COVID-19 vaccination rates in Europe. China has invested US$10 billion in Serbian infrastructure and energy including projects such as the Budapest–Belgrade railway. Chinese Hesteel Group took over the struggling Smederevo steel plant, keeping 5,000 Serbians employed.

Vučić has stated that "Serbia firmly supports the Chinese government's positions in safeguarding China's core interests including Hong Kong, Taiwan and Xinjiang and supports the "One Belt And One Road" initiative" According to commentators, China has replaced Russia to become Serbia's strongest ally.

Kosovo 
China backs Serbia's position regarding Kosovo. The PR Chinese Foreign Ministry has made a statement stressing that the PRC "expresses grave concern" over Kosovo's unilateral declaration of independence. The spokesman Liu Jianchao's remarks go on to add that "The resolution of the Kosovo issue bares  on peace and stability of the Balkan region, the fundamental norms governing international relations as well as the authority and role of the UN Security Council. China always believes that a plan acceptable to both Serbia and Kosovo through negotiations is the best way to resolve this issue. The unilateral move taken by Kosovo will lead to a series of consequences. China is deeply worried about its severe and negative impact on peace and stability of the Balkan region and the goal of establishing a multi-ethnic society in Kosovo. China calls upon Serbia and Kosovo to continue negotiations for a proper resolution within the framework of the international law and work together to safeguard peace and stability of the Balkan region. The international community should create favorable conditions for that." 

Serbian Deputy Prime Minister Božidar Đelić told reporters after a meeting in Beijing with Politburo member Liu Yandong that China reiterated its support to help Serbia preserve her territorial integrity. "Just as Serbia supports the one China policy, China supports Serbia as its best and most stable friend in southeastern Europe." Ambassador of China to Serbia, Wei Jinghua, stated in June 2009 that "China respects the sovereignty and territorial integrity of Serbia and understands the great concern of Serbia on the issue of Kosovo. We support the negotiations between Belgrade and Pristina that would bring a mutually acceptable solution, in accordance with international law, the UN Charter and UN resolutions."

Economic relations 
The People's Republic of China is the most important trading partner of the Republic of Serbia in the region of Asia. The volume of trade between the two countries in 2006 was US$788.1 million with Serbian exports taking US$6.25 million. While in period of January–October 2007, the trade totaled EUR 793.8 million. Serbia's exports to China were worth EUR 3.2 million.

Serbia exports to China are natural rubber, rubber products, machinery and equipment (special machine tools and road vehicles), cork, timber, etc. and Chinese exports to Serbia are machinery and equipment (office equipment, telecommunication equipment, electric machines), various manufactured goods, clothing, footwear, textiles, chemicals and staple items.

In 2006, Serbia officially confirmed its participation at Expo 2010 which took place in Shanghai.

On 18 December 2014, Premier Li Keqiang visited Serbia and attended the opening ceremony of Pupin Bridge.

Culture and education 
Educational and cultural cooperation between the two countries is being maintained under the interstate Agreement on cultural cooperation that was concluded in Beijing on 7 June 1957.

The Confucius Institute in Belgrade has opened on August, 2006 by Tang Jiaxuan.

In February 2020 Slobodan Trkulja held a concert on Kalemegdan in support of Chinese people and victims of coronavirus 2 from Wuhan.

Recent bilateral meetings

Strategic partnership
Serbia and China signed an important strategic partnership agreement in August 2009. The agreement has ten points and covers wide array of subjects including the mutual respect of territorial integrity, plans for trade development as well as cultural, technological and scientific exchange.

See also 
 Foreign relations of the People's Republic of China
 Foreign relations of Serbia
 Chinese people in Serbia
 China–Yugoslavia relations

References

External links
  Chinese Foreign Ministry about relations with Serbia
  Serbian Ministry of Foreign Affairs about relations with China 
  Serbian embassy in Beijing

 
Serbia
China, Peoples Republic